Ecology and Society (formerly Conservation Ecology) is a quarterly open access interdisciplinary academic journal published by the Resilience Alliance. It covers an array of disciplines from the natural sciences, social sciences, and the humanities concerned with the relationship between society and the life-supporting ecosystems on which human well-being ultimately depends. The journal's editors-in-chief are Marco Janssen (Arizona State University) and Lance Gunderson (Emory University). C. S. Holling was the founding editor.

According to the Journal Citation Reports, the journal has a 2020 impact factor of 4.403.

Notable articles
As of June 2019, the three most cited articles were:
 BH Walker, C.S. Holling, S.R. Carpenter, A Kinzig. 2004. Resilience, adaptability and transformability in social-ecological systems. Ecology and Society 9(2):5
 J Rockström, W Steffen, K Noone et al. 2009 Planetary Boundaries: Exploring the Safe Operating Space for Humanity. Ecology and Society 14(2):32
 DW Cash, NW Adger, F Berkes et al.  2006. Scale and cross-scale dynamics: Governance and information in a multilevel world. Ecology and Society 11(2):8

References

External links

Open access journals
Ecology journals
Environmental social science journals
English-language journals
Quarterly journals
Publications established in 1997
Environmental humanities journals